NSUT may refer to:

 Merited Artist of Vietnam (Nghệ sĩ ưu tú), an honorary title used in Vietnam
 Netaji Subhash University of Technology, a university in New Delhi, India